Josef Matz (8 December 1925 – 7 March 2005) was an Austrian field hockey player. He competed in the men's tournament at the 1952 Summer Olympics.

References

External links
 

1925 births
2005 deaths
Austrian male field hockey players
Olympic field hockey players of Austria
Field hockey players at the 1952 Summer Olympics
Place of birth missing